The officer ranks of the Royal Air Force, as they are today, were introduced in 1919.  Prior to that Army ranks were used.

Ranks

Notes

Origins
Lieutenant General David Henderson originally proposed that Royal Air Force officers use a combination of British Army and Royal Navy ranks. However, the War Office argued that the RAF should have its own ranks and the Admiralty opposed any use of their rank titles.

Badges of rank
On 1 April 1918, Air Force Memorandum 2 specified rank insignia for the newly established independent force. Rank was to be worn on the jacket cuff and was derived from the Royal Navy's rings, each equivalent rank having the same number of rings. However, second lieutenants (now pilot officers) displayed a crowned eagle only and the Navy's loop was not used for any rank. Depending on the uniform, either gold or pale blue on grey braid was worn.

In August 1918, Air Ministry Weekly Order 617 added a single band of  braid below the second lieutenant's eagle and all other officer ranks also received a crowned eagle above their braid on the left arm only.

In 1919 the colour of the rank braid was changed to black with a central pale blue stripe. However, on RAF mess dress rank continued to be displayed in gold.

Sleeve ranks
The ranks worn on the sleeve are common to all RAF uniform variants incorporating the Jacket.

Shoulder boards

Shoulder boards (as shown) are worn by officers of general rank equivalent (air commodore and above). Officers entitled to wear aiguillettes or the Royal Cypher, AVMs and above, the Director of Nursing Services, and those officers assigned to certain one-star posts, wear plain blue shoulder boards when in No 1 Service Dress. AVMs and above and those officers assigned to the one-star posts of commandant RAFC Cranwell, Air Officer Wales and Air Officer Scotland wear distinctive unranked ceremonial shoulder boards when in No 1A (ceremonial day) dress. If these officers wear a greatcoat, gold ranked shoulder straps in Crombie material are used. Officers of the rank of marshal of the Royal Air Force have a distinctive set of shoulder boards with greater decoration.

Rank titles
It was initially proposed that each RAF officer rank would be either the equivalent army rank (used by the Royal Flying Corps) or the naval rank (used by the Royal Naval Air Service (RNAS)). However, when the Royal Navy and British Army were consulted they made differing objections: the navy was unhappy that another service might use the names of its higher ranks, such as admiral, and the army objected to the RAF sharing the ranks assigned to junior officers. This resulted in a second proposed system, which made frequent use of the neologism ardian, which was derived from the Gaelic ard "chief" and eun "bird". Under this proposal the names were to have been: ensign, lieutenant, flight leader, squadron leader, reeve, banneret, fourth ardian, third ardian, second ardian, ardian and air marshal. A further proposal was: ensign, lieutenant, flight-leader, squadron-leader, wing-leader, leader, flight ardian, squadron ardian, wing ardian, ardian, air marshal. However, this system was rejected within the RAF, due in part to dislike of the neologism ardian.

On 1 August 1919, Air Ministry Weekly Order 973 introduced the official rank titles for RAF officers. Initially, the highest air officer rank was named marshal of the air. However, a few days after this was promulgated, it was changed to marshal of the Royal Air Force; this occurred reputedly at the request of King George V, who believed that the original name implied the powers of a deity. These were often modified versions of Royal Navy terms and in many cases represented a continuation of particular RNAS appointment titles, i.e. a role/command specific to a particular rank. For example, the new RAF rank of flight lieutenant had previously been the name of an RNAS appointment, held only by qualified pilots with the naval rank of lieutenant; a RNAS observer with the same rank was instead known as an observer lieutenant. The RAF rank of squadron leader was derived from an RNAS appointment, squadron commander, which had been held by either a naval lieutenant-commander or lieutenant.

Composite braid

RAF officers typically wear composite braid rank slides with their working and operational uniforms. Composite braid consists of a single piece of fabric, where the "background" between the rank rings is made from blue-grey or olive green material.  Composite braid rank slides are often referred to as "bar-code" in RAF slang.

Command flags

Distinction between ranks and appointments
Many RAF ranks do not imply the appointment or duties of an officer. For example, a pilot officer may well not be trained to pilot an aircraft. In fact, pilots skip the rank of pilot officer and go from officer cadet to flying officer on graduation from officer training school at RAF Cranwell. A squadron leader does not necessarily command a squadron, nor a wing commander necessarily command a wing, nor a group captain command a group.

A group will usually be commanded by an AVM. 'Flying' wings will be commanded by a group captain, with ground-based wings commanded by a wing commander. 'Flying' squadrons are commanded by wing commanders, and ground-based squadrons are typically commanded by squadron leaders.

RAF Air Cadets (Air Training Corps and Combined Cadet Force)

The majority of officers in the Air Cadet Organisation (the Air Training Corps and the RAF section of the Combined Cadet Force) are volunteers commissioned into RAF Air Cadets and then appointed to service with the Air Training Corps or Combined Cadet Force (RAF). They are no longer Royal Air Force Volunteer Reserve (Training Branch) (RAFVR(T)) commissioned officers. They are identified by the gold badge stating: "RAFAC" on the lapels of the No. 1 uniform, and in others forms of dress "RAF Air Cadets" embroidered underneath the rank insignia, in a manner similar to RAF Regiment rank slides. Volunteer officers who are members of an air experience flight (AEF) and who are pilots of aircraft providing air experience flying to air cadets and university air squadrons (UAS) continue to hold a VR(UAS) commission.

RAF Air Cadets officers use the rank system identical to the regular RAF, but the highest substantive rank is flying officer.  Higher ranks within the Air Cadet organisation are acting appointments, up to wing commander. Other senior ranked appointments are generally full-time staff positions (such as regional commandants and commandant air cadets) held by regular and reserve (RAFR/FTRS) RAF officers.  In certain circumstances, honorary appointments within the RAF Air Cadets may be made, however the rank may vary.
After the Death of Queen Elizabeth II, new rank insignia with King Charles III's Royal Cypher is expected to be created.

Timeline of changes

Other air forces

The following air forces use a similar or identical officer rank structure and rank insignia to the RAF:
 Royal Australian Air Force
 Royal New Zealand Air Force
 Hellenic Air Force
 Nigerian Air Force (since 1 April 1976)
 Indian Air Force (formerly the Royal Indian Air Force)
 Bangladesh Air Force
 Sri Lanka Air Force (formerly the Royal Ceylon Air Force)
 Ghana Air Force
 Air Force of Zimbabwe (formerly the Royal Rhodesian Air Force)
 Royal Thai Air Force
 Chilean Air Force
Namibian Air Force
Trinidad and Tobago Air Guard

The following air forces use a similar or identical officer rank structure to the RAF, but use army-style rank insignia:
 Pakistan Air Force (since 2006; formerly the Royal Pakistan Air Force)
 Egyptian Air Force

The following air forces use rank insignia for their officers which are similar or identical to that of the RAF, but employ army rank titles:
 Afghan National Air Corps
 Argentine Air Force
 Belgian Air Component
 Eritrean Air Force
 Finnish Air Force
 Swedish Air Force (sometimes the English translation of the Swedish Air Force officer rank titles follows the RAF pattern)
 Royal Malaysian Air Force
 Peruvian Air Force
 Royal Netherlands Air Force
 Royal Danish Air Force
 Italian Air Force
 Romanian Air Force
 South African Air Force
 Royal Canadian Air Force
 Irish Air Corps
 Uruguayan Air Force
The following air forces formerly used a similar or identical officer rank structure to the RAF:
 Royal Canadian Air Force (until 1968)
 Royal Malaysian Air Force (until the late 1970s)
 Royal Rhodesian Air Force (now the Air Force of Zimbabwe) (1965–1980)

The following air forces formerly used similar rank insignia to the RAF:

 Republic of Singapore Air Force (until 1983)
 United States Air Force, (1993 to 1994)
 Pakistan Air Force (until 2006)
 Royal Air Force of Oman (until the 1980s)
 Egyptian Air Force
 Air Force of the Democratic Republic of the Congo (1997–2010)
 Yemeni Air Force (South Yemen; South Arabian Air Force) (1970-1985)
 Zaire Air Force (1971–1997)

See also
 Aircrew brevet
 Comparative military ranks of World War I
 Comparative military ranks of World War II
 Comparative military ranks
 List of Royal Air Force members
 Military rank
 RAF other ranks
 Ranks and insignia of officers in NATO air forces
 Ranks of the cadet forces of the United Kingdom
 Royal Observer Corps ranks
 Women's Auxiliary Air Force ranks

Notes

References

General references 
 Hobart, Malcolm. Badges and Uniforms of the Royal Air Force. London/Barnsley, England: Leo Cooper/Pen & Sword Books Ltd., 2000. .

External links
 RAF Ranks at the official website of the RAF

 
Air force ranks
British military insignia